Before the Flood is a 2016 documentary film about climate change directed by Fisher Stevens. The film was produced as a collaboration between Stevens, Leonardo DiCaprio, James Packer, Brett Ratner, Trevor Davidoski, and Jennifer Davisson Killoran. Martin Scorsese is an executive producer.

The film covers effects of climate change in various regions of the world, and discusses climate change denial. Numerous public figures are interviewed in the documentary. To offset the carbon emissions of the production, the filmmakers paid a voluntary carbon tax. The soundtrack features compositions by Trent Reznor and Atticus Ross, Mogwai and Gustavo Santaolalla.

The film premiered at the Toronto International Film Festival in September 2016, and was released theatrically on October 21, before airing on the National Geographic Channel on October 30. As part of National Geographic's commitment to covering climate change, the documentary was made widely available and free of charge on various platforms. It received generally positive critical reviews.

Background
At the European premiere in London in October 2016, DiCaprio introduced the film as follows:

Content

The film shows DiCaprio visiting various regions of the globe exploring the impact of global warming. As a narrator, DiCaprio comments these encounters as well as archive footages. DiCaprio repeatedly references a 15th-century triptych by Hieronymus Bosch, The Garden of Earthly Delights, which, he explains, hung above his crib as an infant, and which he uses as an analogy of the present course of the world toward potential ruin as depicted on its final panel. The film also documents, in part, the production of DiCaprio's 2015 film The Revenant.

DiCaprio's comments and inquiries focus extensively on climate change denial, mostly among corporate lobbyists and politicians of the United States.

They interview with British-born astronaut Piers Sellers, a NASA scientist who flew on three space missions, discusses his desire to publicize the perils of global warming in the short time he expected he had remaining to live, as he had stage IV pancreatic cancer as he was being filmed. He died on December 23, 2016.

Cast
Along with DiCaprio, the documentary's subjects include Piers Sellers, Barack Obama, Pope Francis, Sunita Narain, Anote Tong, John Kerry, Elon Musk, Alejandro González Iñárritu, Johan Rockström, Greg Mankiw, Gidon Eshel, Farwiza Farhan, Ian Singleton, Lindsey Allen, Jeremy Jackson, Thomas Remengesau Jr., Alvin Lin, Ma Jun, Michael E. Mann, Philip Levine, Jason E. Box,  Dr. Enric Sala, Michael Brune, and Ban Ki-Moon.

Subjects for the DVD's extra or deleted scenes include: Mark Z. Jacobson, Steven Chu, Andrew Baker, Ben Kirtman, and Sala. Topics include education, politics, coral, hurricanes, and urgency.

Broadcast and streaming 
The film was made available freely on the internet between October 30 and November 6, 2016, the run up to US Election Day, having aired on the National Geographic Channel in 171countries and on some countries' national television channels. The film is subtitled in 45languages, making it accessible for non-English audiences. The film had been watched more than 2million times on the day following its release. As of November 2022, it is available for streaming on Disney+.

Carbon tax 
The film takes a closer look into the possibility of a carbon tax benefiting the American nation. In addition, they state that, "the carbon emissions from Before the Flood were offset through a voluntary carbon tax."

Reception

Critical response
The film received mostly positive reviews from critics. On Rotten Tomatoes, it has a 75% approval rating, based on 32 reviews with an average score of 7.00/10. On Metacritic, it has a score of 63 out of 100, based on 10 critics, indicating "Generally favorable reviews."

Before the Flood was described as "surprisingly moving" in W and as "a heartfelt, decent, educational documentary about the most important issue of our time" by The Guardian.

Variety praised the fact that "given the sincerity of its message, its ability to assemble such a watchable and comprehensive account gives it an undeniable urgency," stating that "where the film succeeds the most is by focusing on the ground-level victims of climate change, whether the polar bears of the Arctic, or the inhabitants of island nations like Kiribati."

Accolades

Soundtrack

The film's soundtrack was written and performed by Mogwai, Trent Reznor, Atticus Ross, and Gustavo Santaolalla.

See also
 Don't Look Up

References

External links
 
 Before the Flood on Dailymotion
 National Geographic's Free to Watch Site hosting 'Before the Flood' until November 7, 2017 – National Geographic TV Shows, Specials & Documentaries
 
 
 

Documentary films about global warming
American documentary films
2016 films
2016 documentary films
2016 in the environment
Films directed by Fisher Stevens
Films produced by Leonardo DiCaprio
Films scored by Mogwai
Films scored by Trent Reznor
Films scored by Atticus Ross
Films scored by Gustavo Santaolalla
National Geographic (American TV channel) original programming
Television Academy Honors winners
2010s English-language films
2010s American films